Agrippa Menenius Lanatus was consul of the Roman Republic in 439 BC and possibly the consular tribune of 419 and 417 BC.
 
Menenius belonged to the Menenia gens. His father was Titus Menenius Lanatus, consul in 477 BC. Following filiations he was probably the brother of Lucius Menenius Lanatus, consul in 440 BC, and uncle of Licinius Menenius Lanatus.

Career 
Menenius was one of three patricians sent to lead the colonization of Ardea by the orders of the consuls Marcus Fabius Vibulanus and Postumus Aebutius Helva Cornicen in 442 BC. The two other members of the triumviri coloniae deducendae were Titus Cloelius Siculus and Marcus Aebutius Helva.

In 439 BC Menenius was elected consul together with the elderly Titus Quinctius Capitolinus Barbatus. The year saw a large conspiracy led by Spurius Maelius and the appointment of Lucius Quinctius Cincinnatus as dictator for a second and final time.

Twenty years later in 419 BC, Menenius or possibly another Agrippa Menenius Lanatus, son of Titus Menenius Lanatus, consul in 452 BC, was elected as consular tribune. This consular tribune was re-elected in 417 BC.

See also 
 Menenia gens

References 

5th-century BC Roman consuls
Lanatus, Agrippa 315